Nastradamus is the fourth studio album by American rapper Nas, released on November 23, 1999, by Ill Will and Columbia Records. It was originally intended to be composed entirely of material from sessions for I Am... and released October 26, but in response to bootlegging of that material, release was postponed one month for Nas to record new material for Nastradamus.

The album debuted at number 7 on the US Billboard 200, selling over 232,000 copies in its first week. It received generally mixed reviews from critics, and has been regarded by some as Nas's weakest effort. However, it achieved considerable commercial success and spawned two charting singles. On December 22, 1999, the album was certified Platinum in sales by the Recording Industry Association of America (RIAA).

In retrospect, Nas said: “On that album, there’s a couple of songs that have a certain sound to it that doesn’t sound like anything else I’ve done. And it was a gray area in my life and that album represents that gray area. It was personal stuff that I’d rather not elaborate on. But I have nothing against that album.”

Track listing

Sample credits
Source

Life We Chose
"Peace Fugue" by Bernie Worrell

Nastradamus
"(It's Not the Express) It's the JB's Monaurail" by The J.B.'s

Come Get Me
"We’re Just Trying to Make It" by The Persuaders
"Week-End" by Cox Orange
"It's Mine" by Mobb Deep

Last Words
"Good Luck Charm" by Ohio Players

Big Girl
"You're a Big Girl Now" by The Stylistics

New World
"Africa" by Toto

Shoot 'Em Up
"Carol of the Bells" by Mykola Leontovych
"If I Die 2nite" by 2Pac

Charts

Weekly charts

Year-end charts

Certifications

References

Works cited

External links
 Nastradamus at Discogs
 Sharps and Flats at Salon.com
 Album Review at Yahoo! Music UK

1999 albums
Nas albums
Albums produced by Dame Grease
Albums produced by DJ Premier
Albums produced by Havoc (musician)
Albums produced by L.E.S. (record producer)
Albums produced by Timbaland
Columbia Records albums